Center Point is an unincorporated community in Kerr County, Texas, USA.

History

In the mid-1850s, as Kerr County was establishing a new county seat, a small community to the south was being established as a major trade area between Comfort and Kerrsville (later changed to Kerrville) and Bandera and Fredericksburg.

On November 25, 1859, the first post office was established and called Zanzenberg after the ancestral home of the town founder Charles Ganahl. Originally opened in the home of Ganahl, the post office stayed there until 1872 when it was moved to the south side of the Guadalupe River, where a sizable community was being built. When the post office was reopened it was called Center Point due to its location on the trade routes.

Founded largely by settlers from western Tennessee, the community continued to grow as relatives and neighbors from Tennessee converged on the banks of the Guadalupe to call Zanzenburg/Center Point their new home. On September 1, 1857, the first native of Center Point, Daniel C. Nowlin, was born to James Crispin Nowlin and Ann Gathings Nowlin. Daniel served as Kerr County Surveyor, sheriff of Lincoln County, New Mexico, and then to Wyoming where he was a prominent sheep rancher until his death on February 5, 1925.

The first attempt at incorporating Center Point came on August 9, 1889 for "school purposes".

At the turn of the 20th century, Center Point was a thriving trade center and remained so until, like so many communities in America, it became the victim of new highways passing it by. Once again, on March 1, 1913, Center Point voted itself an incorporated city, appointed a mayor, city clerk, commissioners’ health officer, and then, in October of the same year, dissolved itself by a popular vote of the people. It remained unincorporated until the mid-1990s, when voters once again approved incorporation. Within less than two years, it was once again voted that the incorporation should be dissolved. As such, Center Point remains one of the largest unincorporated communities in the state of Texas.

Demographics

2020 census

As of the 2020 United States census, there were 1,263 people, 624 households, and 544 families residing in the CDP.

Climate
Center Point experiences a humid subtropical climate, with hot summers and a generally mild winter.

Notable people
 Carl Pfeufer, comic book artist, magazine illustrator, and fine artist, lived in Center Point.
 Stacy Sutherland, lead guitarist of 13th Floor Elevators, is buried in Center Point Cemetery.
 Edwin Walker, United States Army officer, was born in Center Point.
 Catherine "Sara" Haden, actress, born in Center Point on November 17, 1898.

Education
The Center Point Independent School District serves area students.

Photo Gallery

References
Much of the information above was gleaned from "Kerr County Texas 1856-1956" by Clara Watkins revised edition of Bennett Book.

External links

Center Point Texas Handbook of Texas online
 

Unincorporated communities in Texas
Unincorporated communities in Kerr County, Texas
Populated places established in 1859
Populated places on the Guadalupe River (Texas)
1859 establishments in Texas